Keihäsmatkat is a Finnish drama TV series published on the Ruutu streaming service of the Nelonen channel in spring 2020. The series is about the Keihäsmatkat travel agency in the 1960s and the 1970s as well as its founder Kalevi Keihänen. Keihänen is played by Janne Kataja. The events in the series start from 1972 when Keihänen had acquired two aircraft and started his own airline Spear Air.

Shooting of Keihäsmatkat began in July–August 2019 and the series was shot during autumn 2019 in Finland and Turkey.

Publication of the series on television offended Keihänen's family, who felt it was an insult to his memory. The family has asked that the series should not be shown on television and according to newspaper articles, the family is considering taking legal action against the producers.

Cast
 Janne Kataja: Kalevi Keihänen
 Jenni Banerjee: Armi, a purser
 Aku Hirviniemi: Tapio, a steward
 Hannele Lauri: Sirkka, a local guide
 Bianca Bradey: Juanita
 Taisto Oksanen: Gunnar Korhonen, CEO of Finnair
 Niina Lahtinen: Marja-Liisa, secretary of Korhonen
 Janika Terho: Maija, a stewardess
 Ville Tiihonen: Urpo Lahtinen
 Ilari Johansson: Irwin Goodman
 Ilkka Vainio: Junnu Vainio
 Lauri Ketonen: Tarmo Manni
 Markus Karekallas: Reidar Särestöniemi
 Ilkka Heiskanen: Kalervo Palsa
 Martti Suosalo: Raipe
 Anna-Leena Sipilä: Marke
 Jarkko Pajunen: Heikki
 Krisse Salminen: Johanna
 Kiti Kokkonen: Kuutamo
 Sanna Stellan: Tuula
 Inka Kallén: Leena
 Joonas Kuokkanen: Anssi
 Konstantin Nikkari: Sakari
 Sebastian Rejman: Morris
 Venla Savikuja: Erja
 Josefina Salo: Suvi Paaso
 Ylermi Rajamaa: Mikko
 Ismo Apeli: Ringo
 Markku Haussila: Gabriel
 Jarkko Tiainen: Erkki
 Sami Saikkonen: a priest
 Ella Pyhättö: Lissu
 Ari-Matti Hedman: Perttu
 Jarmo Mäkinen
 Tino Virta: a waiter
 Janita Juvonen: Anne
 Antti Peltola: Jyri

References

2020s drama television series
Finnish drama television series